Akyar (Aqyar) is a rural locality (a selo) and the administrative center of Khaybullinsky District of the Republic of Bashkortostan, Russia, located on the Tanalyk River. Population:

References

Notes

Sources

Rural localities in Khaybullinsky District